Harrisonville is a town in Cass County, Missouri, United States. The population was 10,121 at the 2020 census. It is the county seat of Cass 
County. It is part of the Kansas City metropolitan area.

History
Harrisonville was founded in 1837 upon land donated to Cass County by Congress for county purposes, and was named for Congressman Albert G. Harrison, who was instrumental in obtaining the land grant. The area suffered greatly during the American Civil War, though Harrisonville was one of the few places exempted in Union General Thomas Ewing's General Order No. 11 (1863), which ordered the depopulation of three entire Missouri counties and part of a fourth.

In 1972, Harrisonville was the site of escalating tensions between a handful of mostly Vietnam veterans and town elders, which culminated in a brief rampage by 25-year-old Charlie "Ootney" Simpson. In the town square, in plain view of onlookers, he killed two police officers and a bystander before shooting himself. The victims were officers Donald Marler and Francis Wirt and local businessman Orville Allen.  His motivation turned out to be personal, not political; he had saved money to buy a farm, but the seller had recently backed out of the deal, and Simpson had used the money to bail his friends out of jail.

The Robert A. Brown House, Harrisonville Courthouse Square Historic District, and St. Peter's Episcopal Church are listed on the National Register of Historic Places.

A May 2017 report from Missouri State Auditor Nicole Galloway gave the city the lowest possible rating of "poor," citing complex, often overlapping tax districts, contracts awarded without appropriate bidding processes and overuse of money pulled from restricted funds.

Geography
Harrisonville is located in central Cass County at the intersection of U.S. 71, Missouri Route 2 and Missouri Route 7.

Demographics

2010 census
As of the census of 2010, there were 10,019 people, 3,854 households, and 2,516 families living in the city. The racial makeup of the city was 95.0% White, 1.1% African American, 0.7% Native American, 0.6% Asian, 0.8% from other races, and 1.7% from two or more races. Hispanic or Latino of any race were 2.6% of the population.

There were 3,854 households, of which 36.6% had children under the age of 18 living with them, 44.7% were married couples living together, 15.3% had a female householder with no husband present, 5.3% had a male householder with no wife present, and 34.7% were non-families. 29.6% of all households were made up of individuals, and 13.9% had someone living alone who was 65 years of age or older. The average household size was 2.49 and the average family size was 3.07.

The median age in the city was 35.5 years. 27.1% of residents were under the age of 18; 8.4% were between the ages of 18 and 24; 26.6% were from 25 to 44; 22.4% were from 45 to 64; and 15.5% were 65 years of age or older. The gender makeup of the city was 47.2% male and 52.8% female.

2000 census
As of the census of 2000, there were 8,946 people, 3,457 households, and 2,302 families living in the city. The population density was 1,035.2 people per square mile (399.8/km2). There were 3,646 housing units at an average density of 421.9/sq mi (162.9/km2). The racial makeup of the city was 96.15% White, 0.97% African American, 0.66% Native American, 0.47% Asian, 0.01% Pacific Islander, 0.39% from other races, and 1.34% from two or more races. Hispanic or Latino of any race were 1.41% of the population.

There were 3,457 households, out of which 35.5% had children under the age of 18 living with them, 50.6% were married couples living together, 12.4% had a female householder with no husband present, and 33.4% were non-families. 28.9% of all households were made up of individuals, and 14.0% had someone living alone who was 65 years of age or older. The average household size was 2.48 and the average family size was 3.05.

In the city, the population was spread out, with 27.6% under the age of 18, 8.1% from 18 to 24, 29.4% from 25 to 44, 19.6% from 45 to 64, and 15.3% who were 65 years of age or older. The median age was 35 years. For every 100 females, there were 87.4 males. For every 100 females age 18 and over, there were 82.8 males.

The median household income was $39,498, and the median family income was $47,761. Males had a median income of $31,931 versus $22,416 for females. The per capita income for the city was $17,280. About 4.7% of families and 6.5% of the population were below the poverty line, including 8.4% of those under age 18 and 5.1% of those age 65 or over.

Education
Harrisonville R-IX School District is the local school district. It operates an Early Childhood Center, two elementary schools, one middle school, Harrisonville High School, and Cass Career Center.

Harrisonville has a public library, a branch of the Cass County Public Library.

Notable people
 Robert C. Bell, United States federal judge.
 Angelica Bridges, actress, model and singer.
 Delmer Brown, Japanologist.
 Chris Koster, 41st Attorney General of Missouri
 Edward Capehart O'Kelley, The man who killed Robert Ford, who killed Jesse James.
 Vicky Hartzler, Member of the US House Of Representatives For Missouri's 4th District.

References

External links
 City of Harrisonville
 Historic maps of Harrisonville in the Sanborn Maps of Missouri Collection at the University of Missouri

Cities in Cass County, Missouri
County seats in Missouri
Populated places established in 1837
1837 establishments in Missouri
Cities in Missouri